Steal My Heart (lit. Catch Me) is a 2013 South Korean romantic comedy film written and directed by Lee Hyeon-jong, starring Kim Ah-joong and Joo Won.

Plot
Lee Ho-tae is a police profiler who has a 100 percent success rate in tracking down suspects. One day while he's on a stakeout, the criminal attempts to flee and gets run over in a hit and run accident. When Ho-tae follows the driver to make an arrest, he finds himself face to face with Yoon Jin-sook, the first girl he ever loved. Their relationship had ended ten years ago. Taken aback, Ho-tae stalls his fellow officers by locking up Jin-sook in his own home, but as old feelings resurface, he finds out more shocking truths about his ex-girlfriend, like the fact that she's a notorious thief who's long been on the most wanted list for stealing priceless artworks and gems across Seoul. Together, they try to come up with a solution to keep Jin-sook out of prison while the rest of the police force search for her.

Cast
 Kim Ah-joong as Yoon Jin-sook/Lee Sook-ja
 Joo Won as Lee Ho-tae
 Joo Jin-mo as Chief detective
 Baek Do-bin as Oh Kyeong-wi
 Bae Sung-woo as Sergeant Park
 Hwang Tae-kwang as Detective Lee
 Kim Min-sung as Detective Jo
 Kang Min-jung as Detective Na
 Park Young-woong as Detective Bong
 Ji Sang-min as Detective Ji
 Nam Yeon-woo as Detective Tak
 Kang Deok-joong as Detective Choi 
 Kim Hee-won as Auctioneer 
 Sa Hee as Joo-ri 
 Shin Seung-hwan as Bar part-timer 
 Kim Mi-ra as Diamond Lady Kim 
 Lee Sang-hoon as Guard 
 Cha Tae-hyun as Guy next door (cameo)
 Park Chul-min as Fence (cameo)
 Joo Suk-tae as Jin Sook's older brother
 Cha Chung-hwa as Human rights organization representative

References

External links
  
 
 
 

2013 films
2010s Korean-language films
South Korean romantic comedy films
2013 romantic comedy films
Lotte Entertainment films
2010s South Korean films